The canton of Ancerville is an administrative division of the Meuse department, northeastern France. Its borders were modified at the French canton reorganisation which came into effect in March 2015. Its seat is in Ancerville.

It consists of the following communes:
 
Ancerville
Aulnois-en-Perthois
Baudonvilliers
Bazincourt-sur-Saulx
Brillon-en-Barrois
Cousances-les-Forges
Guerpont
Haironville
L'Isle-en-Rigault
Juvigny-en-Perthois
Lavincourt
Maulan
Montplonne
Nant-le-Grand
Nant-le-Petit
Rupt-aux-Nonains
Saudrupt
Savonnières-en-Perthois
Silmont
Sommelonne
Stainville
Tannois
Tronville-en-Barrois
Velaines
Ville-sur-Saulx

References

Cantons of Meuse (department)